Do You Know This Voice? is a 1964 British neo-noir directed by Frank Nesbitt and starring Dan Duryea, Isa Miranda and Gwen Watford. It is based on the 1960 novel of the same title by Evelyn Berckman.

Cast
 Dan Duryea as Hopta
 Isa Miranda as Mrs. Marotta
 Gwen Watford as Mrs. Hopta
 Peter Madden as Superintendent Hume
 Barry Warren as Detective Sergeant Connor
 Alan Edwards as Mr. Wilson
 Jean Aubrey as Trudy
 Shirley Cameron as Mrs. Wilson
 Arnold Bell as Desk Sergeant
 Patrick Newell as Neighbour
 Hedger Wallace as Reporter

References

Bibliography
 Clinton, Franz Anthony. British Thrillers, 1950-1979: 845 Films of Suspense, Mystery, Murder and Espionage. McFarland, 2020.

External links
 

1964 films
1960s thriller films
British thriller films
Films set in London
British Lion Films films
British mystery films
1960s mystery films
1960s English-language films
1960s British films